Antonio Carattino (born 2 April 1923) is an Italian former sailor who competed in the 1952 Summer Olympics, in the 1956 Summer Olympics, and in the 1968 Summer Olympics.

References

External links
 

1923 births
Living people
Italian male sailors (sport)
Olympic sailors of Italy
Sailors at the 1952 Summer Olympics – Dragon
Sailors at the 1956 Summer Olympics – 5.5 Metre
Sailors at the 1968 Summer Olympics – 5.5 Metre